The 5th Michigan Infantry Regiment was an infantry regiment from Michigan that served in the Union Army during the American Civil War. The regiment was mustered into federal service in August 1861 and served in the Eastern Theater. It fought in all the major battles of the Army of the Potomac, including Seven Pines, the Seven Days Battles, Second Bull Run, Chantilly, Antietam, Fredericksburg, Chancellorsville, Gettysburg, the Wilderness, Spotsylvania, Cold Harbor, Petersburg, and Appomattox. The regiment was mustered out in June 1865.

Service
The 5th Michigan Infantry was organized at Detroit, Michigan and mustered into Federal service for a three-year enlistment on August 28, 1861.

In October 1862 the Army of the Potomac was reorganized. The 5th Michigan, along with the 17th Maine Volunteer Infantry Regiment, was placed in the 3rd Brigade, 1st Division, 3rd Corps. "Our regiment is assigned to the 3rd Brigade, 1st Division, III Corps (Union Army). This Brigade is commanded by General Berry of Maine (Hiram Gregory Berry), who is at this time sick at home. The division is commanded by General Birney of Pennsylvania (David B. Birney), the corps by Major General George Stoneman (George Stoneman). Colonel Poe of Michigan is in temporary command of our brigade."

The regiment was mustered out on July 5, 1865, at Jeffersonville, Indiana.

Total Strength and Casualties
The regiment mustered a total of 1586 men during its existence.
It suffered 454 fatalities: 16 officers and 247 enlisted men were killed in action or mortally wounded, and 3 officers and 188 enlisted men died of disease. 

"When compared to other Michigan regiments that fought in the Civil War, the Fifth Michigan stands out. It had the second highest number of casualties of all Michigan infantry regiments in the war. Of all Union infantry regiments in the war, the Fifth Michigan ranked fifth in total number of casualties endured. A logical explanation for so many combat deaths and wounds is the fact that the Fighting Fifth played a key role in numerous charges against Confederate positions: twice at Williamsburg (Battle of Williamsburg), and at Fair Oaks (Battle of Seven Pines) the Wilderness (Battle of the Wilderness), Spotsylvania, North Anna, and Petersburg."

Commanders

Colonel Henry D. Terry; 1861- Jun 1862 
Major John D. Fairbanks; 25 Jun 1862- 30 Jun 1862 
Captain Judson S. Farrar; Jul 1862 
Captain William Wakenshaw; Aug 1862 
Lieutenant Colonel Gilluly; - 13 Dec 1862 (KIA) 
Lieutenant Colonel Sherlock; 13 Dec 1862  - 3 May 1863 (KIA) 
Lieutenant Colonel John Pulford; 3 May 1863 – 5 May 1864 
Major Salmon S. Mathews; 5 May 1864 
Captain William Wakenshaw; 6 May 1864 
Captain Edgar H. Shook; 6 May 1864,
Lieutenant (unnamed); May 1864 
Colonel John Pulford; Jun 1864 
Major Daniel S. Root; Aug 1864 
Lieutenant Colonel Salmon S. Mathews; Oct 1864 
Lieutenant Colonel Daniel S. Root; 31 Jan 1865 
Colonel John Pulford; 28 Feb 1865 – 17 Jul 1865

Timeline
August 28, 1861	Organized at Detroit, Mich., and mustered in. 
September 11	Left State for Washington, D.C.
September 13	Attached to Richardson's Brigade, Heintzelman's Division, Army of the Potomac and duty in the Defenses of Washington, D.C.
October 21–24	Reconnaissance to Occoquan.
January 9, 1862	Pohick Run, Va.
March, 1862 	Attached to Berry's 3rd Brigade, Kearny's 3rd Division, 3rd Army Corps, Army of the Potomac.  (See III Corps (Union Army).
March 10–15	Advance to Manassas, Va.
March 17	Moved to the Virginia Peninsula .
March to August.	Peninsula Campaign.
April 5-May 4	Siege of Yorktown, Va. (see Siege of Yorktown (1862).
May 31-June 1	Battle of Fair Oaks, or Battle of Seven Pines.
June 25-July 1	Seven Days Battles.
June 25	Battle of Oak Grove.
June 29	Battle of Savage's Station and at Peach Orchard.
June 30	Charles City Cross Roads and Glendale.
July 1	Battle of Malvern Hill.
July 2 - August 16	Duty at Harrison's Landing.
August 16–26	Movement to Fortress Monroe, then to Centreville; 3rd Brigade, 1st Division, 3rd Army Corps.
August 29	Battle of Groveton during the Second Battle of Bull Run.
August 30	Bull Run.
September 1	Battle of Chantilly.
September 2 - October 11	Duty in the Defenses of Washington, D, C.
October 11-November 23	March up the Potomac to Leesburg, and then to Falmouth.
December 12–15	Battle of Fredericksburg.
January 20–24, 1863	"Mud March" (See Mud March (American Civil War).
January 25 - April 27	At Falmouth.
April 27-May 6	Chancellorsville Campaign.
May 1–5	Battle of Chancellorsville.
June 11-July 24	Gettysburg Campaign.
July 1–3	Battle of Gettysburg.
The Regiment was commanded at Gettysburg by Lieutenant Colonel John Pulford, who was wounded on July 2 - the third of five times during the war.
 
From the Gettysburg monument: "Effective strength July 2nd 1863; present and detached service 21 officers and 262 men, total 283. Casualties: Killed 2 officers, 17 men; Wounded 8 officers 78 men; Missing 4 men; Total 109."
 
"The regiment fought here about 4:30 o'clock p.m., July 2, 1863, after it had been assembled from the skirmish line far in advance of this position. It moved to the support of the 2nd Corps in resisting Pickett's Charge, July 3." 
July 5–24	Pursuit of Lee to Manassas Gap, Va. Battle of Manassas Gap.
July 23	Action at Wapping Heights, Va.
August 16-September 17	On detached duty at New York City and at Troy, N.Y. New York City draft riots.
October 9–22	Bristoe Campaign. 
October 13	Auburn.
November 7–8	Advance to line of the Rappahannock during the Second Battle of Rappahannock Station.
November 7	Kelly's Ford
November 26-December 2	Battle of Mine Run
November 27	Payne's Farm 
January 4 to
February 14, 1864	Veterans on furlough
February 6–7	Demonstration on the Rapidan during the Battle of Morton's Ford. 
March	Attached to 2nd Brigade. 3rd Division, 2nd Army Corps. (See II Corps (Union Army).
May 4-June 15	Campaign from the Rapidan to the James River. 
May 5–7	Battle of the Wilderness.
May 8	Laurel Hill
May 8–12	Battle of Spotsylvania Court House
May 10	Po River.
May 12–21	Spotsylvania Court House.
May 12	Assault on the Salient ("Bloody Angle").
May 19	Harris Farm, Fredericksburg Road
May 23–26	Battle of North Anna
May 26–28	On line of the Pamunkey
May 8–31	Totopotomoy
June 1–12	Battle of Cold Harbor.
June 16–18	Before Petersburg.
June 16	Siege of Petersburg.
June 22–23	Jerusalem Plank Road, Weldon Railroad.
July 27–29	Demonstration on north side of the James.
July 27–28	First Battle of Deep Bottom.
August 13–20	Demonstration on north side of the James at Deep Bottom. 
August 14–18	Strawberry Plains.
September 29-October 2	Poplar Springs Church
October 27–28	Boydton Plank Road, Hatcher's Run
December 7–12	Warren's Raid on Weldon Railroad
February 5–7, 1865	Dabney's Mills, Hatcher's Run
March 25	Watkins' House 
March 28-April 9	Appomattox Campaign.
March 30–31	White Oak Road
March 31	Crow's House
April 2	Fall of Petersburg
April 3–9	Pursuit of Lee
April 6	Sailor's Creek
April 7	High Bridge
April 9	Battle of Appomattox Court House, surrender of Lee and his army.
May 2–12	March to Washington, D.C.
May 23	Grand Review of the Armies
June 10–14	Moved to Louisville, Ky.
June 15 - July 5	At Jeffersonville, Ind.
July 5, 1865	Mustered out
17 July 1865	Disbanded at Detroit, Mi.

See also
List of Michigan Civil War Units
Michigan in the American Civil War

Notes

References
The Civil War Archive
 Haley, Private John W., The Rebel Yell & the Yankee Hurrah: The Civil War Journal of a Maine Volunteer, Down East Books (Camden, Maine), 1985. This is a journal about the 17th Maine Volunteer Infantry Regiment. The 5th Michigan was in the same brigade and references are made regarding the whereabouts of the 5th.
 Crotty, Color Sergeant Daniel G., Four Years Campaigning in the Army of the Potomac, Dygert Bros. & Co. Printers and Binder (Grand Rapids, MI), 1874. Reprinted with new material in 1995 by Belle Grove Publishing Co. (Kearney, NJ). This is a journal of the 3rd Michigan Volunteer Infantry Regiment. The 5th Michigan was in the same brigade and references are made regarding the whereabouts of the 5th.
 De Trobriand, Regis, Brevet Major-General, U.S. Volunteers, Four Years with the Army of the Potomac, Ticknor and Company (Boston, MA), 1889. Translated from French by George K. Dauchy. Régis de Trobriand was the commanding officer of the Army of the Potomac, III Corps (Union Army), 1st Division, 3rd Brigade, of which the 5th Michigan was a part of during much of the American Civil War.
 Sneden, Private Robert Knox, Eye of the Storm: A Civil War Odyssey, The Free Press (New York), 2000. Private Sneden was a member of the 40th New York Volunteer Infantry Regiment. The 40th New York and 5th Michigan were members of the same brigade (Army of the Potomac, III Corps (Union Army), 1st Division, 3rd Brigade) and several mentions of the Michigan boys are included in the book.
 Sebrell, Thomas E. II, The 'Fighting Fifth': The Fifth Michigan Infantry Regiment in the Civil War's Peninsula Campaign, The Michigan Historical Review, Volume 35 No. 2, Fall 2009, pages 27 – 51."

Units and formations of the Union Army from Michigan
1865 disestablishments in Michigan
1861 establishments in Michigan
Military units and formations established in 1861
Military units and formations disestablished in 1865